National Trust for Scotland properties is a link page listing the cultural, built and natural heritage properties and sites owned or managed by the National Trust for Scotland.

Aberdeen and Grampian
Castle Fraser, Garden & Estate
Craigievar Castle
Crathes Castle, Garden & Estate
Drum Castle, Garden & Estate
Fyvie Castle
Haddo House
Leith Hall, Garden & Estate
Mar Lodge Estate & Mar Lodge
Pitmedden Garden

Angus
Angus Folk Museum
Barry Water Mill
Finavon Doocot
House of Dun & Montrose Basin Nature Reserve
J. M. Barrie's Birthplace, Kirriemuir

Argyll, Bute and Loch Lomond
Arduaine Garden
Ben Lomond
Bucinch & Ceardach
Crarae Garden
Geilston Garden, Cardross
Hill House, Helensburgh
Tighnabruaich Viewpoint

Ayrshire and Arran
Bachelor's Club
Brodick Castle, Garden & Country Park
Culzean Castle & Country Park
Goatfell
Robert Burns Birthplace Museum
Souter Johnnie's Cottage

Central Scotland
Alloa Tower
Bannockburn
Ben Lawers National Nature Reserve
Cunninghame Graham Memorial
Dollar Glen
Menstrie Castle
Moirlanich Longhouse
The Dunmore Pineapple

Dumfries & Galloway
Broughton House & Garden
Bruce's Stone
Grey Mare's Tail Nature Reserve
Murray Isles
Rockcliffe
Thomas Carlyle's Birthplace
Threave Castle & gardens
Venniehill

Edinburgh & the Lothians
Caiy Stane
Gladstone's Land
House of the Binns
Inveresk Lodge Garden
Malleny House and Garden
Newhailes
No 28 Charlotte Square
Preston Mill & Phantassie Doocot
Georgian House

Fife
Balmerino Abbey
Falkland Palace, Garden & Old Burgh
Hill of Tarvit Mansionhouse & Garden
Kellie Castle & Garden
The Royal Burgh of Culross

Greater Glasgow and Clydesdale
Black Hill
Cameronians' Regimental Memorial
David Livingstone Centre
Greenbank Garden
Holmwood House
Hutchesons' Hall
Kittochside, The Museum of Scottish Country Life
Parklea, Port Glasgow
Pollok House
Tenement House (Glasgow)
Weaver's Cottage

Inverness, Nairn, Moray & The Black Isle
Boath Doocot
Brodie Castle
Culloden
Miller House and Hugh Miller's Cottage

Lochaber
Glencoe & Dalness
Glenfinnan Monument

Northern Isles
Fair Isle
Parcels of land on the islands of Unst and Yell

Perthshire
Branklyn Garden
Craigower
Dunkeld
Killiecrankie
Linn of Tummel
The Hermitage

Ross-shire
Balmacara Estate & Lochalsh Woodland Garden
Corrieshalloch Gorge National Nature Reserve
Falls of Glomach
Inverewe Garden
Kintail & Morvich
Shieldaig Island
Strome Castle
Torridon
West Affric

Scottish Borders
Harmony Garden, Melrose (National Trust for Scotland)
Priorwood Garden and Dried Flower Shop
Robert Smail's Printing Works
St Abb's Head National Nature Reserve

West Coast Islands
Burg, Isle of Mull
Canna & Sanday
Iona
Macquarie Mausoleum
Mingulay, Berneray & Pabbay
St Kilda World Heritage Site
Staffa National Nature Reserve

See also
 List of National Trust properties in England
 List of National Trust properties in Wales
 List of National Trust properties in Northern Ireland
 Conservation in the United Kingdom

References

External links
 The National Trust for Scotland
 The National Trust (England, Wales and Northern Ireland)

 
National Trust for Scotland properties, List
National Trust for Scotland properties